Association Island is a  island located at the northern tip of Stony Point, a peninsula on the eastern shore of Lake Ontario. A  two-lane causeway connects the island to the mainland.

History 
Association Island was once part of a continuous protrusion of land known in the 19th century as Six Town Point. The name was in reference to the town of Henderson being recorded as the sixth of 11 unnamed towns that were delineated during a 1796 survey of the Black River Tract. Erosion from Lake Ontario waves divided Six Town Point into several small islands at some time prior to 1898.

A fort of French construction briefly existed upon Six Town Point during the 18th century. It is uncertain exactly who constructed the fort, and precisely when it was constructed; however it was likely built in 1756 under the order of General Montcalm during the French and Indian War, just prior to his victory at the Battle of Fort Oswego in August 1756.

In 1905 the National Electric Light Association bought the island, which resulted in the name "Association Island". NELA management used it for meetings. General Electric, after it acquired NELA in 1911, also used the island for company meetings.

The Elfun Society, a management organization and think-tank within General Electric, was founded on the island in 1928. The society's logo was a drawing of a large elm tree from the island.  General Electric donated the island to the YMCA in 1959, and the Elfun Society was dissolved by General Electric in 2014.

After receiving the island in 1959, the YMCA ran a boy's summer camp on the island for several years until abandoning it after 1967.

A non-profit group ran sailing and Boardsailing competitions on the island in the 1970s.

The island became a privately owned RV park and resort in 1999.  The RV park operates as "Association Island KOA 1000 Islands" with address 15530 Snowshoe Rd. Henderson, NY 13650.  It is an independently owned KOA franchise.

In popular culture 
Kurt Vonnegut based some of the material in his 1952 novel Player Piano on General Electric's meetings and activities at the island, and claimed that the island was "shut down" after the book was widely read in Schenectady, New York, the location of the company's headquarters.

References

External links
 KOA 1000 Islands Campground on Association Island

Islands of Jefferson County, New York
Private islands of New York (state)
Islands of Lake Ontario in New York (state)
Private islands of the Great Lakes